Javier Iturriaga Arrillaga (born 3 November 1983) is a Spanish former footballer who played as a midfielder.

Early life
Unlike most of the players brought up at Athletic Bilbao, Iturriaga was not born in the Basque Country, or even in Spain. He was born and grew up in Mexico City, his family having moved to Mexico in the early 1980s from their native city of Zarautz after his father was relocated for business purposes to that Latin American country.

Iturriaga went to elementary school in Mexico, but at the age of 13 his family returned to Europe where he attended St Edmund's College in Ware, Hertfordshire. He showed his natural sporting talents there, quickly learning to play cricket and gaining a place in the Hertfordshire under-14 rugby county team, having played the game for only a few weeks; after high school he finally went back to Spain, where he became a regional junior champion in the racquet sport padel and began to play football with local CD Getxo while planning to study civil engineering.

Club career
In 2002, aged 18, Iturriaga joined Athletic Bilbao following in the footsteps of his brother Iñigo, and meeting the criteria of the club's philosophy despite his birthplace by having developed as a footballer in the Basque region. He first appeared for the farm team, CD Basconia followed by the reserves, spending two seasons playing regularly with each squad. 

Iturriaga was definitely promoted to the main squad for the 2006–07 campaign, but only appeared in four La Liga games as the side finished one place above relegation (17th). His debut came on 15 October 2006, as he came on as a substitute for Pablo Orbaiz in the 58th minute of the 3–2 away win against Gimnàstic de Tarragona; during his spell at the San Mamés Stadium, he was mainly restricted to Copa del Rey matches.

In the following summer, Iturriaga was released by Athletic and signed with Segunda División team UD Salamanca where he was also highly unsuccessful, going on to serve two loans in Segunda División B, including one at SD Lemona. In 2009, he left but stayed in the Biscay area, moving to amateurs Club Portugalete.

After three seasons in Tercera División, Iturriaga signed for Getxo where he had already spent his formative years.

International career
Iturriaga declared he wished to represent Mexico internationally. Hugo Sánchez, the legendary striker who played in Spain for twelve years and was then in charge of the national team, stated that he would have him in consideration and follow his progress. However, the manager left his post to work with a club, and the player did not receive any call-ups.

Personal life
Away from football, Iturriaga gained a master's degree in industrial engineering from the University of the Basque Country and became a professional in the field.

References

External links

1983 births
Living people
Mexican people of Basque descent
Mexican people of Spanish descent
Spanish footballers
Mexican footballers
Footballers from Mexico City
Footballers from the Basque Country (autonomous community)
Association football midfielders
La Liga players
Segunda División players
Segunda División B players
Tercera División players
CD Getxo players
CD Basconia footballers
Bilbao Athletic footballers
Athletic Bilbao footballers
UD Salamanca players
Lorca Deportiva CF footballers
SD Lemona footballers
Club Portugalete players
People educated at St Edmund's College, Ware